Chelis rasa is a moth in the family Erebidae. It was described by Saldaitis, Ivinskis and Churkin in 2000. It is found in China (Xinjiang: the Karlik Mountains).

This species was moved from the genus Palearctia to Chelis as a result of phylogenetic research published in 2016.

References

Moths described in 2000
Arctiina